Benita Yalonda Pearson (born February 1963) is a United States district judge of the United States District Court for the Northern District of Ohio and formerly a United States magistrate judge on the same court.

Early life and education

Born and raised in Cleveland, Pearson earned a Bachelor of Science degree in accounting from Georgetown University in 1985 and then earned a Juris Doctor from the Cleveland State University College of Law in 1995.

Professional career

From 1985 until 1992, Pearson worked for BP, first as a corporate accountant (1985–1987) and then as a supervisor of retail marketing accounting (1987–1990) and then in retail sales (1990–1992). From 1992 until 1994, Pearson worked as a law clerk for a Cleveland law firm, and from 1995 until 1996, Pearson served as a litigation associate for a Cleveland law firm. From 1996 until 1998, Pearson served as a law clerk for United States District Court for the Northern District of Ohio Judge John Michael Manos. From 1998 until 2000, Pearson served as a general litigation associate for Jones Day Reavis & Pogue in Cleveland. From 2000 until 2008, Pearson served as an Assistant United States Attorney in Cleveland.

Federal judicial service

In August 2008, Pearson became a United States magistrate judge of the United States District Court for the Northern District of Ohio.

In July 2009, Pearson was recommended to serve as a United States District Judge on the United States District Court for the Northern District of Ohio by both Ohio Senators, Democrat Sherrod Brown and Republican George Voinovich. On December 3, 2009, President Obama formally nominated Pearson to serve on the Northern District of Ohio. Pearson was chosen to fill the seat vacated by Judge Peter C. Economus, who assumed senior status. The United States Senate Committee on the Judiciary reported Pearson's nomination to the full Senate on February 11, 2010. Her nomination was confirmed by the Senate on December 21, 2010 by a 56–39 vote, with George Voinovich of Ohio casting the lone Republican 'aye' vote. She received her commission on December 27, 2010. She became the first African-American woman to hold a federal judgeship in Ohio.

See also 
 List of African-American federal judges
 List of African-American jurists
 List of Cleveland State University College of Law alumni
 List of first women lawyers and judges in Ohio

References

External links

1963 births
African-American judges
BP people
Cleveland–Marshall College of Law alumni
Georgetown University alumni
Judges of the United States District Court for the Northern District of Ohio
Living people
Lawyers from Cleveland
United States district court judges appointed by Barack Obama
21st-century American judges
United States magistrate judges
Assistant United States Attorneys
Jones Day people
21st-century American women judges